All Saints Church is an Anglican church and Grade I Listed building in Goxhill, North Lincolnshire, England.

Architecture
The chancel dates to the 13th century AD, and the nave, aisles and tower to the 14th-15th centuries.

Gallery

References

13th-century church buildings in England
Church of England church buildings in Lincolnshire
Grade I listed churches in Lincolnshire
Borough of North Lincolnshire
13th-century establishments in England